The 1986 Grand Prix de Tennis de Toulouse was a men's tennis tournament played on indoor carpet in Toulouse, France that was part of the Regular Series of the 1986 Grand Prix tennis circuit. It was the fifth edition of the tournament and was held from 6 October to 12 October.

Seeds
Champion seeds are indicated in bold text while text in italics indicates the round in which those seeds were eliminated.

Draw

Finals

References

Doubles
Grand Prix de Tennis de Toulouse